The Puerto Rico National Guard Museum is a museum in San Juan, Puerto Rico dedicated to the Puerto Rico National Guard. The museum was inaugurated on August 18, 2002 by Major General Emilio Díaz Colón.

2002 establishments in Puerto Rico
Military and war museums
Military and war museums in Puerto Rico
Puerto Rico National Guard
National Guard (United States) museums